Sputnik is the name of several rural localities in Russia:
Sputnik, Chelyabinsk Oblast, a settlement in Travnikovsky Selsoviet of Chebarkulsky District in Chelyabinsk Oblast; 
Sputnik, Krasnodar Krai, a settlement under the administrative jurisdiction of Chernomorsky Settlement Okrug in Seversky District of Krasnodar Krai; 
Sputnik, Moscow Oblast, a settlement in Sputnik Rural Settlement of Mozhaysky District in Moscow Oblast; 
Sputnik, Murmansk Oblast, an inhabited locality under the administrative jurisdiction of Pechenga Urban-Type Settlement in Pechengsky District of Murmansk Oblast; 
Sputnik, Novosibirsk Oblast, a settlement in Cherepanovsky District of Novosibirsk Oblast; 
Sputnik, Samara Oblast, a settlement in Volzhsky District of Samara Oblast
Sputnik, Sverdlovsk Oblast, a settlement in Gayevsky Selsoviet of Irbitsky District in Sverdlovsk Oblast